Adrián Turmo Jodar (born 24 January 2001) is a Spanish professional footballer who plays for Girona FC B as a forward.

Club career
Born in Palma, Mallorca, Balearic Islands, Turmo joined Girona FC's youth setup in July 2019, from AD Penya Arrabal. In the following year, he was promoted to the reserves and renewed his contract until 2022.

Turmo made his first team debut on 4 October 2020, coming on as a late substitute for Jairo Izquierdo in a 0–1 Segunda División home loss against CF Fuenlabrada. He scored his first senior goal fourteen days later, netting the third for the B's in a 3–0 Tercera División away win against UE Figueres.

References

External links

2001 births
Living people
Footballers from Palma de Mallorca
Spanish footballers
Association football forwards
Segunda División players
Tercera División players
Girona FC B players
Girona FC players